Events in world sport through the years 1736 to 1740.

Boxing
Events
 1736 — Broughton defeated Bill Gretting, but it is unclear if it was a championship fight.
 1736 — Broughton defeated Taylor after 20 minutes in London. Broughton claimed the English title and held it until 1750.
 1737 — Broughton defeated John Smith ("Buckhorse") in London to retain the title.
 1738 — Broughton defeated Prince Boswell in London to retain the title.
 1739 — Broughton defeated Will Willis in London to retain the title.
 1740 — Broughton defeated Sailor Field in London to retain the title.

Cricket
Events

Horse racing
Events
 1740 — Parliament introduced an Act "to restrain and to prevent the excessive increase in horse racing", though it was largely ignored.

References

Sources
 
 
 
 

1736